Ptocheuusa albiramis is a moth of the family Gelechiidae. It was described by Edward Meyrick in 1923. It is found in Egypt.

The wingspan is about 9 mm. The forewings are light yellow ochreous with irregular white streaks along all margins of the cell and veins 7-11, partially sprinkled with dark fuscous scales on the edges, and with a slender similar streak along the dorsum and termen throughout. There is an undefined streak of white suffusion along vein 1b. The hindwings are grey whitish.

References

Moths described in 1923
Ptocheuusa